Dub Take the Voodoo Out of Reggae is a studio album released by Mad Professor with Lee "Scratch" Perry, released in 1996.

Critical reception
The St. Louis Post-Dispatch stated: "Mad Professor makes a fun farrago of Perry's vocals by compressing them, varying their speed, and echoing them in cascades toward the horizon as the drums and bass maintain militancy."

AllMusic wrote that "as insane as Perry normally sounds, being awash in the psychedelic soundwaves of dub suits his raving-madman vocal style even more perfectly."

Track listing 
All tracks by Mad Professor

 "Cheerful Dub" – 3:23
 "Drummer Boy Dub" – 5:32
 "Bounce Back Dub" – 3:54
 "Dub Voodoo" – 3:16
 "Shadow of Dub" – 3:46
 "Mystic Powers of Dub" – 4:06
 "Arkwell Dub" – 3:33
 "Mr. Dubfire" – 3:43
 "Dub Connection" – 3:59
 "Messy Dub Apartment" – 3:21

Personnel 
Mad Professor –  vocals, producer, keyboards
Rob Alton – producer, samples, drums
Errol "Black Steel" Nicholson – guitar
Derek Litchmore – bass, keyboards, drums
William Forde – bass, keyboards
Patrick Augustus – steel pan

References 

Mad Professor albums
1996 albums
Lee "Scratch" Perry albums